The U.S. Army Sustainment Center of Excellence (SCoE) [pronounced sko or sko-e] is a subordinate organization under the Combined Arms Support Command (CASCOM) at Fort Lee, Virginia.

SCoE definition 

SCoE is way of describing CASCOM Headquarters oversight of one of several multi-branch, multi-school Centers of Excellence (CoE) within the United States Army Training and Doctrine Command (TRADOC).

TRADOC Centers of Excellence (CoEs) came about as a result of a 2005 Base Realignment and Closure (BRAC) Commission recommendation. According to TRADOC a CoE is, "a premier organization that creates the highest standards of achievement in an assigned sphere of expertise by generating synergy through effective and efficient combination and integration of functions while reinforcing the unique requirements and capabilities of the branches".

CoEs with a similar structure to the SCoE are Fires (Fort Sill, OK), Maneuver (Fort Benning, GA) and Maneuver Support (Fort Leonard Wood, MO).

SCoE headquarters building 

The $50 million SCoE headquarters building, completed in 2009, contains the headquarters for CASCOM, the Quartermaster Center and School (QMC&S), the Ordnance Center and School (OC&S), and the Transportation Center and School (TC&S).

As part of the creation of the SCoE, the Army Logistics Management College (ALMC) has become the Army Logistics University (ALU) where professional development training takes place for logistics officers, warrant officers, non-commissioned officers and civilians. ALU is located on a separate  campus in the new $136 million ALU Building completed in 2009.

On 30 July 2010, the SCoE building was dedicated as Mifflin Hall in honor of Major General Thomas Mifflin the first Quartermaster General. At the same time the former Quartermaster School Headquarters, which is to be demolished, was decommissioned as Mifflin Hall.

SCoE Nation 

The Sustainment Center of Excellence is sometimes unofficially referred to as the "SCoE Nation" by its military and civilian members. It's a new tradition that encourages a sense of belonging, of camaraderie and esprit de corps within the organization.

Subordinate commands 

 U.S. Army Ordnance Center and School
 U.S. Army Quartermaster Center and School
 U.S. Army Transportation Center and School
 U.S. Army Soldier Support Institute Fort Jackson, South Carolina
 U.S. Army Adjutant General School
 U.S. Army Financial Management School
 U.S. Army Recruiting and Retention School
 U.S. Army School of Music
 U.S. Army Logistics University

Commanders  

 Major General James E. Chambers from 2008 to 11 June 2010
 Brigadier General Jesse Cross from 11 June 2010 to 9 September 2010
 Major General James L. Hodge from 9 September 2010 to 26 June 2012
 Major General Larry D. Wyche from 26 June 2012 to 22 August 2014
 Major General Stephen R. Lyons from 22 August 2014 to 7 August 2015
 Major General Darrell K. Williams from 7 August 2015 to 31 May 2017
 Major General Paul C. Hurley, Jr. from 31 May 2017 to 23 August 2018
 Brigadier General Douglas M. McBride Jr. interim commander 23 August 2018 to 17 September 2018
 Major General Rodney D. Fogg from 17 September 2018 to 9 July 2021
 Major General Mark T. Simerly from 9 July 2021 to present

Insignia  

Shoulder Sleeve Insignia. Description:   A shield-shaped embroidered item blazoned as follows: Argent, a torch of knowledge enflamed Or, the torch base Argent (Silver Gray), between five mullets Azure; all within a  red border.

Symbolism:   Red, white, and blue are the national colors. The torch of knowledge symbolizes the training functions of the center to transform service members into proficient logistic leaders and soldiers. Gold/yellow denotes excellence. The five stars represent the five major elements of Sustainment – maintenance, supply, transportation, human resources, and financial services.

The shoulder sleeve insignia was approved effective 1 January 2009, and was worn starting on 1 October 2009.

References 

Sustainment Center of Excellence Pamphlet, Fort Lee Public Affairs Office, 3 March 2009
TRADOC News Service, "BRAC Commission Recommendations Become Law", 10 November 2005.

External links
Combined Arms Support Command/Sustainment Center of Excellence Official Website

Military education and training in the United States
Military logistics of the United States
Training installations of the United States Army
United States Army Training and Doctrine Command